André Mattoni (born Andreas Leo Otto Edler von Mattoni; 24 February 1900 – 11 January 1985) was an Austrian actor.

Mattoni was originally cast in Fritz Lang's Metropolis (1927) but was replaced by Gustav Fröhlich four weeks into shooting.

Selected filmography 
 The Telephone Operator (1925)
 Wood Love (1925)
 The Found Bride (1925)
 Why Get a Divorce? (1926)
 Tartuffe (1926)
 Svengali (1927)
 Youth Astray (1927)
 Light Cavalry (1927)
 The Student Prince in Old Heidelberg (1927)
 Charlotte Somewhat Crazy (1928)
 Mary's Big Secret (1928)
 The Veil Dancer (1929)
 They May Not Marry (1929)
 Beware of Loose Women (1929)
 Street Acquaintances (1929)
 Wenn Du noch eine Heimat hast (1930)
 Ein süsses Geheimnis (1932)
 Spies at Work (1933)
 Her Highness Dances the Waltz (1935)
 Red Tavern (1940)
 Much Ado About Nixi (1942)
 Abenteuer im Grand Hotel (1943)
 Viennese Girls (1945)

Bibliography
 Eisner, Lotte H. The Haunted Screen: Expressionism in the German Cinema and the Influence of Max Reinhardt. University of California Press, 2008.

External links
 

1900 births
1985 deaths
20th-century Austrian people
Austrian male film actors
Austrian male silent film actors
Actors from Karlovy Vary
Bohemian nobility
German Bohemian people
Austrian people of German Bohemian descent
20th-century Austrian male actors
Austrian expatriates in the United States
Edlers of Austria